Sinauli is an archaeological site in western Uttar Pradesh, India, at the Ganga-Yamuna Doab. The site gained attention for its Bronze Age solid-disk wheel carts, found in 2018, which were interpreted by some as horse-pulled "chariots".

The excavations in Sinauli were conducted by Archaeological Survey of India (ASI) in 2005-06 and in mid-2018. The remains found in 2005–2006 season, the "Sanauli cemetery", belong to the Late Bronze Age, and were ascribed by excavation director Sharma to the Harappan civilisation, though a Late Harappan Phase or post-Harappan identification is more likely.

Major findings from 2018 trial excavations are dated to c. 2000 - 1800 BCE, and ascribed to the Ochre Coloured Pottery culture (OCP)/Copper Hoard Culture, which was contemporaneous with the Late Harappan culture. They include several wooden coffin burials, copper swords, helmets, and wooden carts, with solid disk wheels and protected by copper sheets. The carts were presented by Sanjay Manjul, director of the excavations, as chariots, and he further notes that "the rituals relating to the Sanauli burials showed close affinity with Vedic rituals."

Some see the suggestion of identification as "chariots" as a challenge to the Indo-Aryan migration theory, indicating the presence of horses before the arrival of the Indo-Aryans. Others object, noting that solid wheels belong to carts, not chariots. According to Asko Parpola these finds were ox-pulled carts, indicating that these burials are related to an early Aryan migration of Proto-Indo-Iranian speaking people into the Indian subcontinent, "forming then the ruling elite of a major Late Harappan settlement."

In December 2018 ASI approved a new phase of digging at Sinauli. The official communication from ASI was sent to an amateur archaeologist in Baraut.

Excavations
The site at Sinauli was accidentally discovered by people levelling agricultural land. The farmers came across human skeletons and ancient pottery. The Archaeological Survey of India (ASI) began excavations at the site in September 2005.

2005-2006 excavations
The 2005-06 excavation headed by D. V. Sharma, ASI found more than a hundred burials (no coffins) tentatively dated c. 2200–1800 BCE. Sharma associated the finding with the Harappan (Indus) civilisation, which has been contested, as a Late Harappan or post-Harappan identification is more likely. Carbon dating has now confirmed that the burials date back to c. 1865-1550 BC, based on "two C-14 (carbon dating) dates -- 3815 and 3500, with a margin of error of 130 years."

The burials are all oriented in a NW-SE direction and most are identified as primary burials. Some of the burials are identified as secondary, multiple and symbolic burials. The age of the buried starts from 1–2 years and includes all age groups and both male and female. Grave goods generally consisted of odd number of vases/bowls (3, 5, 7, 9, 11 etc.) placed near the head, with dish-on-stand usually placed below the hip area as well as flask-shaped vessels, terracotta figurines, gold bracelets and copper bangles, beads of semi-precious stones (two necklaces of long barrel shape), steatite, faience, and glass.

The two antennae swords from Sinauli, one found in situ in a grave with a copper sheath, has similarities to the Copper Hoard Type in a Late Harappan context. A dish-on-stand and a violin-shaped flat copper container (having nearly 35 arrowhead shaped copper pieces placed in a row) are included in other important grave goods from Sinauli. The survey found that a dish-on-stand was usually placed below the hip area, but in some cases was placed near the head or feet. The stand is holding the head of a goat in one case.

Remains of a burnt brick wall with a finished inner surface ran along the eastern side of the burial.

2018 excavations 

Trial excavations conducted at Sinauli in March–May 2018 (about 100 m from the 2005-06 site) have yielded the remains of several coffin burials and three full-sized carts. Prior to obtaining C-14 dates, Sanjay Manjul, ASI director (excavations), surmised the burials belonged to the period c. 2000 - 1800 BCE, contemporaneous with, but different from, the Late Harappan culture but belonging to the Ochre-coloured pottery (OCP)/Copper Hoard Culture. Other discoveries include copper helmets, copper antenna swords, copper swords, a ladle made of copper, grey-ware pottery, large terracotta pots, red vases with flaring rims, copper nails and beads. Wooden coffins were first discovered at Harappa in Punjab and then from Dholavira in Gujarat. Local youths, after being given a basic training, were also enlisted into the excavation activities by the ASI.

Coffin Burial finds
Seven human burials - including three coffin burials - have been excavated by the ASI at Sinauli in 2018. In all burials the head was found to be on the northern side, with pottery beyond the head and on the south after the feet. The copper objects are kept below the "sarcophagi."

Coffin Burial I: Primary burial (2.4 m long and 40 cm high). Alongside two full-sized carts. No remains of a draught animal(s) - horse or bull - is found. The wooden parts of the coffin are decomposed.

The wooden coffin stands on four wooden legs. The entire coffin, including legs, is covered with copper sheets (3mm thickness) on all sides. The sides of the coffin have running floral motifs. The copper sheet on the legs also has intricate carvings. The coffin lid has eight motifs carved (high relief) on it. It depicts either a person with a headgear (made of two bull horns and a pipal leaf in the centre) or a bull head.

Body of an adult man inside the coffin: oriented in NW-SE direction (head facing NW).

Carts: carts have two solid wheels (not spoked). The wheels rotated on a fixed axle linked by a shaft to the yoke. The chassis of the two cart are made of wood and covered with thick copper sheets. The wheels are decorated with triangles made of copper (fastened on the wheel with copper nails). The triangles are distributed in three concentric circles from the hub flange of the wheel. The seat seemed to semi-circular. The frame of the seat is made of copper pipes. A pipe for the attachment of the umbrella is also visible.

Coffin Burial II: The third cart was found with another wood coffin burial. The pit also included a shield (decorated with geometrical patterns in copper), a torch, an antenna sword, a digger, hundreds of beads and a variety of pots. The cart, unlike the ones found in the other two, has (copper triangle) decorations on the pole and yoke.

Coffin Burial III: Skeleton of a woman (primary burial, coffin burial with no copper lid): wearing an armlet (made of banded agate beads around the elbow). Burial goods: 10 red vases with flared rims, four bowls, two basins, a thin "symbolic" antenna sword, bow and arrows.

Interpretation of the Coffin Burial finds

The carts were presented by Sanjay Kumar Manjul, director of the excavations and of ASI, as chariots used in war, similar to Indo-Aryan technology. According to Manjul, "For the first time in the Indian subcontinent, chariots have been recovered from any excavation," coming from a royal burial from the Ochre Coloured Pottery (OCP)/Copper Hoard Culture. Manjul further noted that "the rituals relating to the Sanauli burials showed close affinity with Vedic rituals," and stated that "the dating of the Mahabharata is around 1750 BCE."

Suggesting the presence of horses in India before the arrival of the Indo-Aryans, some see this as a challenge to the Indo-Aryan migration theory. However, the identification as "chariot" is problematic, since the wheels were solid, not spoked as in chariots. This would require oxen to pull the heavy carts, which were unfit for use in battle, in contrast to the horse-pulled chariots introduced by the Indo-Aryans. According to historian Ruchika Sharma, Jawaharlal Nehru University,

According to Michael Witzel, rejecting the identification as chariots, "[t]his find may point to the survival of an extra-Harappan organized society." According to Asko Parpola, the carts must have been ox-pulled, and are indications of an early Aryan migration of Proto-Indo-Iranian speaking people from the Sintashta culture into the Indian subcontinent, "forming then the ruling elite of a major Late Harappan settlement," predating the migrations of pre- and proto-Rig Vedic people. Parpola:

The finds have also been popularly associated with the Hindu Epics, as the carts evoke similarities with chariots in the Epic narratives, and local legends tell that Sinauli is one of the five villages that god Krishna unsuccessfully negotiated with the Kaurava princes to avoid the War at Kurukshetra.

See also 
Chandayan
Mahabharata

Notes

References

Sources
Printed sources

 

 

 

 

 

News-sources

Indigenous Aryanism
Bronze Age sites in Asia